A teardown is the demolition for replacement of a home or other building that was recently purchased for that purpose. Frequently, the new building is larger than the previous one. Reasons for developers to tear down can include increasing the appeal of the property to prospective buyers or taking advantage of rising property values. The process is common in older suburbs, where people wish to have larger homes, and yet do not want to move to distant exurbs or new developments. 

Replacement often brings modernization, new structures being built to modern building codes, energy efficiency standards, and aesthetics. They may be in different architectural style, thus not fitting the historic character of the neighborhood. However, not all older homes have historical or architectural value. Finally, an existing house may have no value relative to the land it sits on, such as in wealthy cities like Vancouver, British Columbia. The redevelopment of brownfield land also usually involves teardowns; for example Rockefeller Center was built on land vacated by buying and tearing down older buildings. However, the term is often limited to residential properties.

See also 
 Demolition

References

External links 

 Tear the House Down: A Guide to House Demolition -May 2021, HomeServe

Demolition
House types